This is an index of company-related list articles on Wikipedia.

Company lists

 List of Arab companies
 List of bakeries
 List of BSE SENSEX companies
 List of Caribbean companies
 List of cleaning companies
 List of commodity traders
 List of companies by profit and loss
 List of companies involved in the Holocaust
 List of companies named after people
 List of companies of the European Union
 List of companies paying scrip dividends
 List of companies that switched industries
 List of company and product names derived from indigenous peoples
 List of company name etymologies
 List of conglomerates
 List of copper production by company
 List of drive-in theaters
 List of employee-owned companies
 List of franchises
 List of government-owned companies
 List of holding companies
 List of Korean companies
 List of largest companies by revenue
 List of largest corporate profits and losses
 List of largest employers
 List of largest European manufacturing companies by revenue
 List of largest Internet companies
 List of largest retail companies
 List of multinational corporations
 List of multinationals with research and development centres in Israel
 List of oldest companies
 List of private equity firms
 List of public corporations by market capitalization
 List of re-established companies
 List of S&P 400 companies
 List of Six Sigma companies
 List of SRI International spin-offs
 List of strip clubs
 List of largest technology companies by revenue
 List of the largest software companies
 List of unicorn startup companies
 Lists of corporate assets

By industry

 List of advertising technology companies 
 List of animation distribution companies 
 List of animation studios 
 List of anime companies 
 List of asset management firms 
 List of automation integrator companies 
 List of biotechnology companies 
 List of bitcoin companies
 List of broadcasting companies in Latin America 
 List of bullion dealers 
 List of cable television companies 
 List of CAx companies 
 List of casinos 
 List of Champagne houses 
 List of clock manufacturers 
 List of coffee companies 
 List of computer hardware manufacturers 
 List of computer system manufacturers 
 List of concentrating solar thermal power companies 
 Lists of distribution companies 
 List of duty-free shops
 List of EDA companies 
 List of French electric utilities 
 List of frozen custard companies
 List of Evolution-Data Optimized network equipment suppliers 
 List of filling stations in North America 
 List of film production companies 
 List of film production companies by country
 List of fitness wear brands 
 List of food companies 
 List of home video companies 
 List of ice companies 
 List of largest Internet companies 
 List of investment banks 
 List of IT consulting firms
 List of food trucks 
 List of largest chemical producers 
 List of seafood companies 
 List of tea houses 
 List of trading companies 
 List of management consulting firms 
 List of marketing research firms 
 List of mobile network operators 
 List of mobile app developers 
 List of modeling agencies
 List of multi-level marketing companies 
 List of mutual-fund families in Canada 
 List of mutual-fund families in the United States 
 List of OGL publishers 
 List of largest oil and gas companies by revenue 
 List of oil exploration and production companies 
 List of oilfield service companies 
 List of pharmaceutical companies 
 List of photovoltaics companies 
 List of pornographic film studios
 List of pornography companies 
 List of printer companies
 List of European power companies by carbon intensity 
 List of private equity firms 
 List of rum producers 
 List of private security companies 
 List of ship companies 
 List of silicon producers 
 List of the largest software companies 
 List of private spaceflight companies 
 List of steel producers 
 List of system-on-a-chip suppliers 
 List of talent management system companies 
 List of tea companies 
 List of largest technology companies by revenue 
 List of telephone operating companies 
 List of television production companies 
 List of television networks by country 
 List of public utilities 
 List of venture capital firms 
 Lists of video game companies 
 List of video game developers 
 List of vineyards and wineries 

 List of Car Brands

By type

Aviation

Aircraft manufacturers

Airlines
 Lists of airlines

Banks

Bookstores

 List of bookstore chains
 List of independent bookstores
 List of independent bookstores in the United States

Consulting firms
 List of IT consulting firms
 List of management consulting firms

Food and drink related
 Beer and breweries by region
 List of microbreweries
 List of coffeehouse chains
 List of ice cream parlor chains
 List of soft drink producers

Restaurants

 List of restaurant chains
 List of casual dining restaurant chains
 List of fast food restaurant chains
 List of pizza chains
 List of pizza franchises

Information technology

 List of computer hardware manufacturers 
 List of computer system manufacturers 
 List of IT consulting firms

Law firms

 Big Five law firms
 List of largest law firms by revenue
 List of largest Chinese law firms
 List of largest European law firms
 List of largest Japanese law firms by number of lawyers
 List of largest United Kingdom-based law firms
 List of law firms by profits per partner

Magazines

Manufacturers
 List of elevator manufacturers
 List of wallpaper manufacturers

Mobile network operators

 List of mobile phone makers by country
 List of mobile network operators
 List of mobile network operators of Europe
 List of mobile network operators of the Americas
 List of mobile network operators of the Asia Pacific region
 List of mobile network operators of the Middle East and Africa
 List of Canadian mobile phone companies
 List of mobile network operators of The Caribbean
 List of United States wireless communications service providers

Newspapers

Publishing companies

Radio stations

Record labels

Retail Stores
List of supermarket chains
List of hypermarkets
List of superstores
List of department stores
List of convenience stores

Television stations

North America

 List of television stations in North America by media market

Transport companies

By country

Canada
 List of companies of Canada
 List of largest companies in Canada

India
 List of companies of India

Korea
 List of companies of Korea

The United States
 List of companies of the United States by state

The United Kingdom
 List of companies of the United Kingdom
 List of largest United Kingdom employers

Lists of defunct companies

 List of defunct fast-food restaurant chains
 List of defunct gambling companies
 List of defunct graphics chips and card companies
 List of former municipal bus companies of the United Kingdom
 List of defunct network processor companies
 List of defunct utility companies in Victoria, Australia

By type

Accounting
 List of former accounting firms

Airlines
 List of defunct airlines

Banks
 List of defunct banks of the Netherlands
 List of former investment banks

Consulting
 List of former consulting firms

Hotels
 List of defunct hotel chains
 List of defunct hotels in Canada

Law firms
 List of defunct law firms

Manufacturers
 List of defunct glassmaking companies
 List of former tractor manufacturers

Newspapers

 List of defunct newspapers of Australia
 List of defunct newspapers of Canada
 List of defunct newspapers of France
 List of defunct newspapers of Germany
 List of defunct newspapers of Norway
 List of defunct newspapers of Quebec
 List of defunct newspapers of Russia
 List of defunct newspapers of Turkey

United States

 List of defunct newspapers of the United States
 List of newspapers in Connecticut in the 18th century
 List of defunct newspapers of Hartford City, Indiana
 List of newspapers in Maryland in the 18th century
 List of newspapers in Massachusetts in the 18th century
 List of newspapers in New Hampshire in the 18th century
 List of newspapers in New York in the 18th century
 List of defunct newspapers of North Carolina
 List of newspapers in Pennsylvania in the 18th century
 List of newspapers in Rhode Island in the 18th century
 List of newspapers in South Carolina in the 18th century
 List of newspapers in Virginia in the 18th century

Railways
 List of defunct railroads of North America
 List of former Australian railway companies
 List of former German railway companies
 List of defunct railway companies in Japan

By country

Canada
 List of defunct Canadian companies
 List of defunct hotels in Canada

United States

 List of defunct airlines of the United States
 List of defunct airports in the United States
 List of defunct automobile manufacturers of the United States
 List of shop signs in Boston in the 18th century
 List of defunct department stores of the United States
 List of defunct restaurants of the United States
 List of defunct railroads of North America
 List of defunct retailers of the United States
 List of defunct television networks in the United States
 List of former transit companies in Dallas

South Korea
 List of Korean companies

See also

 Corporation-related lists (category)
 Fortune Global 500
 Forbes Global 2000
 List of company types
 List of company registers
 List of lists of lists
 Lists of brands
 Lists of companies by country (category)
 Lists of companies by industry (category)
 Lists of companies by revenue (category)
 Lists of companies by stock exchange (category)
 Lists of corporate mergers and acquisitions (category)